Joe Sankey (27 October 1913 – 12 March 1996) was an Australian cricketer. He played seven first-class matches for Tasmania between 1934 and 1948.

See also
 List of Tasmanian representative cricketers

References

External links
 

1913 births
1996 deaths
Australian cricketers
Tasmania cricketers
Cricketers from Tasmania